Gus Bivona (November 25, 1915 – January 5, 1996) was an American reed player — covering a range of clarinets, saxophones and flute — at the height of the big band era. Following World War II, he was a staff musician for the MGM Studio Orchestra, playing on countless soundtracks and sessions. He later became a well-known sidekick of pianist, composer, comedian, and television host Steve Allen. In the late 1950s and early 1960s, Bivona began leading his own band, releasing albums under his own name for labels such as Mercury and Warner Bros.

The 1930s - music upbringing
Bivona got his musical start under the close eye of his parents, both of whom were also musicians. His mother was a pianist, and his father was a guitarist. Bivona's first instrument was violin, but he switched to a combination of alto saxophone and clarinet at the age of 16. His professional debut was in a band led by Spider Johnson, followed by dates all around New England in Leo Scalzi's Brunswick Orchestra. In 1935, Bivona began a lengthy stint with the Jimmy Monaco Orchestra, based out of New York City, and also worked with the Hudson-DeLange Orchestra, and spent several months with Bunny Berigan in 1938. Through the end of the 1930s, he also worked with bandleaders such as Will Hudson and Teddy Powell.

The 1940s and '50s - big bands
The first of Bivona's bands under his own name showed up in 1940, but work as a sideman in more established bands seemed to be more what he was after. This included a period with Benny Goodman from the fall of 1940 through the spring of 1941, just in time to match wits with the sizzling electric guitar solos of Charlie Christian. Prior to joining the Naval Air Force Band, Bivona gigged with Jan Savitt and Les Brown & His Band of Renown. A series of high-profile gigs with Tommy Dorsey and Bob Crosby followed the end of the war, and in 1947 Bivona signed on with MGM. Many studio sessions and freelance recordings were the result, carrying on into the 1950s.

Steve Allen
Once he connected with Allen, the two would occasionally hit the concert trail, including a lengthy club residency at the Roundtable in New York City. Music for Swingers: Gus Bivona Plays the Music of Steve Allen is one delightful documentation of this relationship, originally released in 1958 on Mercury. The pair collaborated on many other West Coast jazz recordings, always in the company of many of the top studio players and arrangers, such as Skip Martin, Henry Mancini and Pete Rugolo.

Family
He married singer Ruth Robin, sister of Leo Robin.
He is the paternal grandfather of Kevin, Justin and Jesse Bivona of The Interrupters

Partial discography

Pictures

References

External links
 IMDb Page
 Mercury Records Collection: Music For Swingers
 Mercury Records Collection: Swingin' and Dancin'
 Mercury Records Collection: Hey! Dig That Crazy Band!
 Mercury Records Collection: Allen's All Stars
 Mercury Records Collection: Big Band Man
 Mercury Records Collection: 10 Saxophones and 2 Basses

1915 births
1996 deaths
American jazz flautists
American jazz clarinetists
American jazz saxophonists
American male saxophonists
Musicians from New London, Connecticut
Burials at Forest Lawn Memorial Park (Hollywood Hills)
20th-century American saxophonists
Jazz musicians from Connecticut
20th-century American male musicians
American male jazz musicians
20th-century flautists